Viesturs Meijers (born 5 December 1967 in Limbaži) is a Latvian chess player who holds the FIDE title of Grandmaster (2004). He starting playing chess at age 10 and his first trainer was I. Dambitis. Meijers became an International Master in 1993 and won the Latvian Chess Championship in 2000. From 1989 to 2010, he participated in more than 80 international tournaments.

Meijers played for Latvia in the Chess Olympiads:
 In 2000, at fourth board in the 34th Chess Olympiad in Istanbul (+3, =7, -3);
 In 2004, at reserve board in the 36th Chess Olympiad in Calvia (+5, =2, -2);
 In 2006, at fourth board in the 37th Chess Olympiad in Turin (+3, =3, -4);
 In 2008, at third board in the 38th Chess Olympiad in Dresden (+5, =3, -1);
 In 2010, at third board in the 39th Chess Olympiad in Khanty-Mansiysk (+3, =3, -3).

He also played for Latvia in the European Team Chess Championship:
 In 2001, at first reserve board in León (+3, =3, -1).

References

External links
 
 
 

1967 births
Living people
Latvian chess players
Chess grandmasters
Chess Olympiad competitors
People from Limbaži